Shëngjin i Vogël is a village in the former municipality of Zall-Bastar in Tirana County, Albania. At the 2015 local government reform it became part of the municipality Tirana.

Demographic History
Shëngjin i Vogël (Shëngjin) is recorded in the Ottoman defter of 1467 as a settlement in the nahiyah of Benda. The village had a total of five households represented by the following household heads: Nikolla Çuroji, Tat Gjika, Vlash Bardi, Martin Rakizi, and Dimitri Çuroji.

References

Populated places in Tirana
Villages in Tirana County